Dragutin "Miško" Čermak (12 October 1944 – 12 October 2021) was a Serbian basketball player and coach.

National team career 
Čermak represented SFR Yugoslavia at the 1968 Summer Olympics and 1972 Summer Olympics.

Coaching career 
After finishing his playing career in 1980, Čermak had coaching stints in Algeria, Kuwait, United Arab Emirates, and Jordan among other places.

Personal life 
He is a son of Nedeljko Čermak, a well known businessman and president of KK Partizan (1970–1972). Čermak married actress Vesna Malohodžić.

He died on 12 October 2021, his 77th birthday.

References

1944 births
2021 deaths
Basketball players at the 1968 Summer Olympics
Basketball players at the 1972 Summer Olympics
Basketball players from Belgrade
BKK Radnički players
Competitors at the 1963 Mediterranean Games
Donar (basketball club) players
FIBA World Championship-winning players
KK Partizan players
Liège Basket players
Medalists at the 1968 Summer Olympics
Mediterranean Games bronze medalists for Yugoslavia
Mediterranean Games medalists in basketball
Olympic basketball players of Yugoslavia
Olympic medalists in basketball
Olympic silver medalists for Yugoslavia
Serbian expatriate basketball people in Belgium
Serbian expatriate basketball people in Jordan
Serbian expatriate basketball people in Kuwait
Serbian expatriate basketball people in France
Serbian expatriate basketball people in the Netherlands
Serbian expatriate basketball people in the United Arab Emirates 
Serbian expatriate basketball people in Turkey
Serbian men's basketball players
Serbian men's basketball coaches
Shooting guards
Yugoslav men's basketball players
1970 FIBA World Championship players
Yugoslav basketball coaches